Starling is a messaging server that enables reliable distributed queuing with a minimal overhead.  The code for Starling was originally developed inside social media firm Twitter and released as open source in 2008.  The program was originally developed by Blaine Cook, now the former lead developer for Twitter.

It speaks the Memcached protocol for maximum cross-platform compatibility. Any language that speaks Memcached can take advantage of Starling’s queue facilities. Starling has been written in Ruby.

References

External links
 Starling project on github

Message-oriented middleware
Twitter services and applications